German singer Kim Petras has released 2 LP records (referred to by various sources as either studio albums or mixtapes), 1 compilation album, 1 demo album, 3 extended plays (EPs), one 2-track single, 17 singles (including seven as featured artist), fifteen promotional singles and has made guest appearances on three non-single songs. Petras began releasing several promotional singles from 2008 to 2014. Petras' debut single "I Don't Want It at All" was released in 2017 and reached the top 60 on Billboard Dance Club Songs chart, as would her 2018 "Heart to Break". The singer premiered her second extended play Turn Off the Light, Vol. 1 on October 1, 2018, charting on the US Independent and Heatseekers Albums charts.

Albums

Studio albums

Compilation albums

Demo albums

Extended plays

Singles

As lead artist

As featured artist

Promotional singles

Other charted songs

Guest appearances

Songwriting credits

Music videos

Notes

References

Petras, Kim
Petras, Kim
Petras, Kim